Each to His Kind is a lost  1917 American drama silent film directed by Edward LeSaint and written by George DuBois Proctor and Paul West. The film stars Sessue Hayakawa, Tsuru Aoki, Vola Vale, Ernest Joy, Eugene Pallette and Guy Oliver. The film was released on February 5, 1917, by Paramount Pictures.

Plot
Heir to the Maharajah of Dharpuli, Rhandah leaves to study in England. Before leaving, he promises his eternal love to Princess Nada and she, as a token of love, gives him an amulet. In England, Amy Dawe, a rich girl, flirts with the prince because she has bet to get the amulet from him. Rhandah tries to hug Amy, but Dick Larimer, her boyfriend, warns him, reminding him that he's just a Hindu.

Back in India, Rhandah licks his wounds: embittered, he meditates revenge and Nada's attitude certainly does not help him, who rejects him not believing his assurances that he has always been faithful to her. The opportunity for revenge comes when Amy and Dick arrive in India and are taken prisoner during a riot. Rhandah, however, will yield to the pleas of Nada who, realizing that Amy is not her rival, now asks for mercy for the two Englishmen.

Cast 
Sessue Hayakawa as	Rhandah
Tsuru Aoki as Princess Nada
Vola Vale as Amy Dawe
Ernest Joy as Col. Marcy
Eugene Pallette as Dick Larimer
Guy Oliver	as Col. Dawe
Walter Long as Mulai Singh
Paul Weigel as Asa Judd
Cecil Holland as The Maharajah

References

External links 
 

1917 films
1910s English-language films
Silent American drama films
1917 drama films
Paramount Pictures films
Films directed by Edward LeSaint
American black-and-white films
Lost American films
American silent feature films
1917 lost films
1910s American films